Natalie is a 2010 South Korean romance mystery erotic film co-written, directed and produced by Ju Kyung-jung. It was the first South Korean 3D film.

The film's title refers to a famous female nude piece by sculptor Jun-hyuk (Lee Sung-jae). The model of the piece has remained a great mystery in the art world, but a young critic (Kim Ji-hoon) claims to have also loved the femme fatale who had been Jun-hyuk's muse.

Plot
Mi-ran, a beautiful dance student (Park Hyun-jin), becomes the model, muse and lover of her philandering sculptor-professor Jun-hyuk (Lee Sung-jae). When Mi-ran realizes that she will never be more than a model for Jun-hyuk, she leaves him for her stalkerish fellow student Min-woo (Kim Ji-hoon).

The story takes place 10 years later, when Min-woo and Jun-hyuk reunite as art critic and interviewee, and the two compare their conflicting memories of Mi-ran, who seems to have since disappeared.

Cast
Lee Sung-jae as Hwang Jun-hyuk 
Kim Ji-hoon as Jang Min-woo 
 as Oh Mi-ran 
Kim Gi-yeon as Park Hyo-rim

References

External links
 
 
 

South Korean erotic romance films
2010 films
South Korean mystery films
2010s romance films
2010 3D films
2010s Korean-language films
South Korean 3D films
2010s South Korean films